Sarairanjan Assembly constituency is an assembly constituency in Samastipur district in the Indian state of Bihar.

Overview
As per Delimitation of Parliamentary and Assembly constituencies Order, 2008, No. 136 Sarairanjan Assembly constituency is composed of the following: Sarairanjan and Vidyapati Nagar community development blocks.

According to business reports Sarairanjan is a best clothing market also  which consists of many stores like Sri Ram Vastralaya:Mata Di Collection.

Sarairanjan Assembly constituency is part of No. 22 Ujiarpur (Lok Sabha constituency).

Election results

2020

1977-2020

In the recent 2015 state assembly elections, Vijay Kumar Chaudhary of JD(U) retained the Sarairanjan seat defeating his nearest rival Ranjit Nirguni of BJP with a margin of 34044 votes. In the 2010 state assembly elections, Vijay Kumar Chaudhary of JD(U) won the Sarairanjan seat defeating his nearest rival Ramshray Sahni of RJD with a margin of 17557 votes. Contests in most years were multi cornered but only winners and runners up are being mentioned. Ramchandra Singh Nishad of RJD defeated Vijay Kumar Chaudhary of JD(U) in October 2005 and Sajan Kumar Mishra of LJP in February 2005. Ramashray Sahni of RJD defeated Chandrakant Chaudhary(BJP) and Akhilanand Jha(INC) in 2000. Ramashray Sahni of JD defeated Nandu Jha of Congress in 1995. Ram Bilash Mishra of JD defeated Nandu Jha of Congressin 1990. Ramashray Ishwar of Congress defeated Yashodanand of BJP in 1985. Ram Bilas Mishra of Janata Party (SC) defeated Suraj Choudhury of Congress (I) in 1980. Yashoda Nandan Singh of Janata Party defeated Ramakant Jha of Congress in 1977.

References

External links
 

Assembly constituencies of Bihar
Politics of Samastipur district